Baseball was contested at the 1954 Central American and Caribbean Games in Mexico City, Mexico.

References
 

1954 Central American and Caribbean Games
1954
1954
Central American and Caribbean Games